There are several distinct urticarial syndromes including:
 Muckle–Wells syndrome
 Familial Mediterranean fever
 Systemic capillary leak syndrome

See also 
 Physical urticarias
 List of cutaneous conditions

References 

Urticaria and angioedema